Simon Fairman (1792–1857) of West Stafford, Connecticut, is credited as having invented the scroll-type lathe chuck in 1830; his son-in-law, Austin F. Cushman invented the self-centering Cushman Universal Chuck. He was issued a patent for his design by the US Patent Office on July 18, 1840.

See also
 Austin F. Cushman

References

1792 births
1857 deaths
19th-century American inventors
People from Stafford, Connecticut